is a 2013 Japanese drama film directed by Isao Yukisada. It is based on the novel Tsuya no Yoru by Areno Inoue.

Cast 
 Abe Hiroshi as Matsuoi 
 Kyōko Koizumi as Tamaki Ishida 
 Maho Nonami as Minato Hashimoto

Plot 
Mastuyo and Tsuya have an unusual relationship, in that Tsuya's out of the ordinary behaviour includes the fact she has various lovers. Matsuya still loves here, and after moving to Oyima, he discovers
that she has cancer. Matsuya takes it upon himself to contact her lovers and let them know of her fate.

References

External links 
 

2013 films
2010s Japanese-language films
Japanese drama films
Films based on Japanese novels
2010s Japanese films

ja:つやのよる#映画